The Western Australia Photo Card is a voluntary photo identification card available to people over 16 and are residents of Western Australia.  Up to two cards can be issued - one with and one without an address.  It is used to prove identity primarily for those without a drivers licence.

On the front of the photo card, a kangaroo can be seen under UV light.

References

Identity documents of Australia